Group Captain Ernest Olawunmi Adelaye was appointed military governor of Rivers State, Nigeria from July 1988 to August 1990 during the military regime of General Ibrahim Babangida.
He signed the edict establishing the Rivers State Polytechnic on March 25, 1989 and performed the formal ceremony of the institution on May 19, 1990.
He retired with the rank of air vice marshal.

References 

1942 births
Living people
Nigerian military governors of Rivers State
Yoruba military personnel